Anthocharis scolymus, the yellow tip, is a butterfly in the subfamily Pierinae whose range is Eastern Asia (East China, Korea, Ussuri) where it is commonplace; occasionally it is found in Japan.

The apex of the forewing is produced and falcate (sickle shaped); white above and below, with dark apical marking and black median spot on the forewing above, and a black spot at apex of hindwing; the male moreover, has a moderately large orange spot in the apical area of the forewing, occurring occasionally also in the female (= ab. virgo form. nov. The butterfly appears in one brood and is common in swampy places. The larva feeds on cress   (Draba, Descurainia sophia, Arabis hirsuta, Cardamine impatiens and Rorippa).

References

scolymus
Butterflies described in 1866
Butterflies of Asia
Taxa named by Arthur Gardiner Butler